Neil Fanning (born 12 April 1967) is an Australian actor, voice actor, stuntman and safety supervisor. He is best known for performing the voice of the lead character Scooby-Doo in the movies Scooby-Doo and Scooby-Doo 2: Monsters Unleashed. Neil's entertainment career has spanned over 30 years performing live shows and over 50 movie, television and commercial roles.

Career
Beginning as an opening day entertainer in June 1991, Neil continued to perform for 14 years in the highly successful and number 1 rated attraction the  Police Academy Stunt Show at Warner Bros. Movie World on the Gold Coast in Queensland, Australia and was the theme parks Employee of the Year in 1997. Neil was the Manager of the Police Academy Stunt Show for many years and represented Warner Bros. Movie World internationally performing shows in Asia. Neil was nominated as Australia's International Performer of the Year at the 1998 International Theme Parks Awards in the USA. In 2015 Neil returned to Warner Bros Movie World for 2 years to perform as a precision drift driver in the Hollywood Stunt Driver 2 Show and was also the shows General Manager for 12 months. Neil was also a Stunt Driving Instructor for locally based company The Stunt Driving Experience and represented Warner Bros. Movie World performing as a High-Speed Precision Stunt Driver from 1998 to 2001 in choreographed car chase shows as a feature of the on-track entertainment for the Gold Coast Indy 300 event. Neil also performed at Dreamworld as a character actor for numerous high season periods. Neil and his son Brodie wrote and created The Brodie And Dad Show, a comedy Podcast of skits and stories with multiple voices and characters performed with his son Brodie that reached Number 3 on iTunes in 2010. 

Alongside his performing career Neil has worked as Workplace Health and Safety Manager in numerous industries including Hi Rise Residential Construction, Aged Care, Labour Hire and major Events and Entertainment.

Neil continues to perform as an MC and interactive comedy character performer in the Corporate Entertainment sector at events for major companies and local and state governments and as an Actor, Stuntman and Voice Artist in the Film and Television industry with a focus as a Safety Supervisor.

Personal life
Neil has 3 children.

Neil volunteers his time as Patron for the East Maitland’s Miracle Assistance Dogs organization. An approved Training Institution providing highly trained Assistance Dogs to empower people with a disability to gain independence and live more fulfilling lives.

Filmography

Film

Television

Video games

References

External links

1967 births
Living people
20th-century Australian male actors
21st-century Australian male actors
Australian male film actors
Australian male television actors
Australian male voice actors
Male actors from Queensland
People from Brisbane